The 2021–22 Vanderbilt Commodores women's basketball team represented Vanderbilt University during the 2021–22 NCAA Division I women's basketball season. The Commodores, led by first-year head coach Shea Ralph, played their home games at Memorial Gymnasium and competed as members of the Southeastern Conference (SEC).

Previous season
The Commodores finished the season 4–4 (0–3 SEC) after cutting their season short due to COVID-19. Head coach Stephanie White was fired after five seasons. UConn assistant Shea Ralph was hired to replace her.

Offseason

Departures

2021 recruiting class

Incoming transfer

Roster

Schedule

|-
!colspan=9 style=| Non-conference regular season

|-
!colspan=9 style=| SEC regular season

|-
!colspan=9 style=| SEC Tournament

|-
!colspan=9 style=| WNIT

See also
2021–22 Vanderbilt Commodores men's basketball team

References

Vanderbilt Commodores women's basketball seasons
Vanderbilt
Vanderbilt Commodores
Vanderbilt Commodores
Vanderbilt